Marinos Tzanes ((1620–1685), also known as Marinos Tzanes Bounialis was a Greek painter and poet.  His brother was one of the most prolific painters of the 17th century.  Emmanuel Tzanes has one of the largest existing catalogs of Greek-style paintings.  His other brother Konstantinos Tzanes also has existing works.  All three brothers were affiliated with San Giorgio dei Greci.  Regrettably, none of Marino's signed works have survived. The family settled in Venice after 1650.  He was a prominent member of the Greek community in Venice.  In 1681, he printed a very important book.  He recorded a historical account of the Cretan War and accompanied the biography with short poems.  The book is called The Cretan War (O Kritikos Polemos) Ο Κρητικός Πόλεμος.  The book is over six hundred pages.

History
Marinos was born on the island of Crete around 1620.  He was from an aristocratic educated family.  His older brother Emmanuel Tzanes  became a priest sometime before 1635.  Marinos was the middle son.  His youngest brother was Konstantinos Tzanes.  All three brothers were painters.  They fled Crete around 1646.  The family first traveled to Corfu.  Both of his brothers completed major works while they were on the island.  They finally migrated to Venice after 1655.  Records indicate Marino was a prominent member of the Greek community of Venice until 1685.  An important historical document demonstrates that Emmanuel  received 52 ducats for icons he painted with Marinos around 1662.  Marino's most important work was a poem about the Cretan War.  He wrote a historical narrative of the Cretan War between (1645–1669).  He wrote the story based on personal experience, eyewitness testimonies, and other oral written sources to address his fellow refugees and compatriots.  The book was first printed in Venice around 1681 with the help of his older brother Emmanuel Tzanes.  The book is over six hundred pages.  The book chronicles different prominent families from the island of Crete and different events during the war.  The book also features countless poems.

Literary Works
The Cretan War (O Kritikos Polemos) Ο Κρητικός Πόλεμος 1681

References

Bibliography

1620 births
1685 deaths
17th-century Greek people
People from Rethymno (regional unit)
Greek Renaissance humanists
17th-century Greek painters
Artist authors
17th-century Greek writers
Italian people of Greek descent
Cretan Renaissance literature